Alfred Kan-Ngam Arthur is an Indian politician from Manipur state. He was elected as MLA from 44 (ST) Ukhrul Assembly Constituency in the 11th Assembly Elections as an Indian National Congress candidate for the term 2017-2022 AD.

Early life
Alfred Kan-Ngam Arthur is the second son of AS Arthur who is a retired Bureaucrat and a politician from Shangshak Phunghon village in Ukhrul district. Prior to joining politics, Alfred had a short stint as a musician and a vocalist in a rock band and thereafter turned to social work and investigative journalism. For the first time, he was fielded in the Assembly Elections in Manipur as a Congress candidate in 2012 general elections. However, he lost the elections to his nearest rival, Samuel Risom from the Naga People's Front by a narrow margin of 56 votes.

Political career
As a legislator, Alfred is considered one of the most vocal members in the house.
He is also one of the most qualified Legislator in Manipur. The improvement of government run educational institutions in Ukhrul district and revamping of Ukhrul District Hospital are attributed as outcome of Alfred's constant arguments and reminders in the state Assembly. Pettigrew College, one of the oldest colleges in Manipur and the only government college in Ukhrul district which was in a dysfunctional state was revived through the initiative of Alfred. He is also considered a strong advocate for youth reformation and empowerment owing to his active involvement in several youth related activities.

References

Living people
Manipur politicians
Indian National Congress politicians
1976 births
People from Ukhrul district